Dabolim is a village, with a total population of around 6700, in Mormugão, Goa, India. It is located about 30 km from the state capital Panjim, 23 km from the South Goa district headquarters Margão and 5 kilometres from Vasco da Gama, the headquarters of Mormugão. Dabolim Airport, the first airport in Goa, is located here.

Government and politics
Mandrem is part of Mandrem (Goa Assembly constituency). Its representative in the Goa Legislative Assembly is Mauvin Godinho. It is also part of South Goa (Lok Sabha constituency).

References

Villages in South Goa district